Irandaam Ulagam is a 2013 Indian Tamil-language romantic fantasy film written and directed by Selvaraghavan. Starring Arya and Anushka Shetty, the film's soundtrack was composed by Harris Jayaraj, with a score composed by Anirudh Ravichander and cinematography handled by Ramji. After several months of production, the film was released worldwide on 22 November 2013.

Plot
Irandam Ulagam is about two stories which unfold concurrently in two different planets – our Earth and an unnamed exoplanet. On earth a timid medical student Ramya who has a crush on an academic mathematician Madhu Balakrishnan, asks him out. He initially refuses her proposal for marriage as his father has a disability, needing his full attention and care. Later, Madhu gradually reciprocates Ramya's love seeing her caring nature and proposes marriage. But, she reluctantly rejects his proposal as her family has already arranged her marriage. While on a trip to Goa, Madhu wins Ramya's heart while her fiancé abruptly cancels the marriage citing dowry as the reason. She suddenly dies in a freak accident, and this is followed by Madhu's paralysed father's death too. Depressed by the sudden twin tragedies, Madhu becomes a vagabond in Goa. He sees an apparition of his dead father that tells him death is an illusion. Later, at a local tourist spot, he follows an empty car to a hilltop and tries to commit suicide. He gets injured and faints while trying to drive the car.

The story moves parallel in the alternate world in a relatively primitive kingdom which protects the immortal Amma. The son of a noble military commander, Maravan, falls in love with a working class orphan, Varna. Maravan, though fearless, does not take an interest in martial arts and roams around the kingdom drinking with his friends. Varna, on the other hand, is interested in a military career though she picks and packs wild mushrooms to eke out a living. She also has the desire to protect Amma from the enemies of the kingdom. While gatecrashing a military admissions exam for Amma's protection, the tyrant king condemns Varna to his harem. Maravan pleads with the king to release Varna, and the king, in return, challenges Maravan to get hold of a lion's skin within three days. Maravan, though inexperienced, fights with the lion that has never been conquered until then and gets Varna released. At the behest of the king, Varna is forced to marry Maravan, which goes against her free will. So, she tries to commit suicide after assaulting the king. But Amma saves her, and the riled king exiles her to the forest. Depressed, Maravan tries to commit suicide in vain. Taunted by new military recruits, Maravan climbs a sacred mountain called Swamimalai.

Meanwhile, with the special powers of Amma, an inter-planetary portal opens briefly between Maravan in Swamimalai and Madhu in Goa. Maravan rescues the fainted Madhu from the car and takes him to Amma for treatment. People of the kingdom celebrate Madhu mistake him for an angel. Enemies lay siege to the kingdom and try to kidnap Amma, but intoxicated Maravan fights them off with the help of Varna, who returns from the forest. When Madhu looks at Varna (who looks like Ramya), flowers begin to bloom in the kingdom for the first time. But the timid people force Varna back into the forests. Later Maravan's bravery is rewarded by his father and king, who admits him into military service. Maravan, with new-found confidence, goes into the forest to meet Varna with food and blankets. But she rejects him again. Madhu, too goes into the forest to meet Varna. This time, Varna accepts his friendship. Marvan gets jealous of Madhu. A stormy night forces Varna to eventually return to the kingdom from the forest. The enemies of the kingdom capture Amma while the irate king sends Maravan for execution for illegally housing Varna. Maravan is captured by the enemy troops while abducting Amma. Madhu and Varna set out through the forest to find Maravan and Amma. Varna eventually realises that she had fallen in love with her husband Maravan after hearing about Ramya. Maravan bravely wipes out the entire army of the enemy and escapes with Amma on a boat. But Madhu is drowned in combat. Amma stops Varna and Maravan from saving him. Then an inter-planetary portal opens briefly again, and Madhu lands in another unnamed exoplanet where he finally meets his soulmate Ramya look-alike again. He earnestly asks her if she is single. Finally, he realises that it is his true destiny.

Cast
 Arya as Madhu Balakrishnan/Maravan
 Anushka as Ramya/Varna/The third world girl
 Venkatesh Harinathan as Venky
 Ashok Kumar as Madhu Balakrishna's Father
 Padu Raman as Chief Doctor
 Hema Rajkumar as Ramya's colleague 
 Selva
 Rohit Kalia as Ramya's fiancé (uncredited; seen in "Kanimozhiyae" song)

Production

Development
After deciding to shelve another project titled Idhu Maalai Nerathu Mayakkam featuring Dhanush and Andrea, Selvaraghavan began shooting with the same cast in June 2010, for a film titled Maravan. Filming was held at Jeppiaar Engineering College in Chennai. The title later was changed to Irandaam Ulagam and in a turn of events, Yuvan Shankar Raja replaced Prakash Kumar as music composer. However, in a sensational turn, Prakash Kumar was assigned again as composer after Yuvan Shankar Raja moved out of the project. The film ran into trouble yet again after lead actress Andrea Jeremiah pulled out of the film.

Meanwhile, Harris Jayaraj was confirmed to be a part of the project as the music director, again replacing Prakash Kumar. Sivakarthikeyan also briefly shot for the film in a supporting role, but was replaced by Venkatesh Harinathan after having creative differences with Selvaraghavan.

Filming

The film shooting took off on 24 December 2011, in Ramoji Film City, Hyderabad. The next schedule was filmed in Goa, inside the BITS-Pilani, Goa Campus, following which the team shot few scenes in Rio de Janeiro and the forests of Brazil. It was reported that Arya and Anushka will play double roles. Selvaraghavan reported that the film will have CGI scenes. Some portions were shot in Hyderabad. Arya worked out to build a huge frame and six-pack abs to fit the muscular lead role. The team returned from Georgia after almost two months of continuous shoot under extreme conditions. Chinmayi dubbed in Tamil for Anushka. The unit after shooting at Ramoji Film City moved to the holy town of Srisailam situated in Nallamala Hills of Kurnool district. Scenes crucial for the story were shot in this last and final schedule. The talkie portions of the project were completed by April 2013.

In October 2013, all post-production work including computer generated imagery work lasting several weeks was finally over and the content was locked. The film cost an estimated 55 crore.

Soundtrack 

Harris Jayaraj was hired to compose the soundtrack of Irandaam Ulagam. All the songs in the soundtrack were written by Vairamuthu. Jayaraj said that the songs would feature breezy romantic and situation based tracks as per the film's central theme. The song "En Kaadhal Thee" sung by S. P. Balasubrahmanyam was recorded in late October 2012.

A single track sung by Dhanush, titled "Pazhangkalla" was released on 2 September 2013. The soundtrack was released at a launch event held at Sathyam Cinemas in Chennai on 18 September 2013. Behindwoods rated the album 3.5 out of 5 stating, "Two creative worlds collide resulting in a beautiful explosion of sounds." The album was mastered and made available for iTunes on 26 September 2013 and within one week of its release, the album topped at the iTunes India charts.

Irandaam Ulagam (Tamil soundtrack)

Irandaam Ulagam (Additionals) 
Initially the album features ten tracks, with all of them being composed by Harris Jayaraj, but he left the project composing 7 songs, due to other commitments. Anirudh Ravichander composed the other three songs, and also the background score. The songs were released as an additional soundtrack on 14 October 2013.

Varna (Telugu soundtrack) 

The album of the Telugu version Varna features seven songs composed by Harris Jayaraj, but the additional tracks were not included in the dubbed version. A single track titled "Paalalle" was released on 10 October 2013. The song was sung by Karthik and Vijay Prakash, is a Telugu version of the song "Pazhangkalla", which sung by Dhanush. Except for this track, the other songs have the same set of vocalists. The soundtrack was released on 26 October 2013.

Marketing
A 70-feet cut-out of Anushka was erected at Shilpa Kala Vedika in Madhapur on the eve of the audio launch.

Release
The satellite rights of the film were secured by STAR Vijay. The film was initially announced to release in Diwali 2013, but was later postponed to 22 November along with its dubbed versions in Telugu titled Varnaa, and in Hindi, Georgian, Russian, Uzbek, and Turkish, placing it among the highly anticipated films of the year. The film was given a U certificate by the Indian Censor Board with no cuts and the film runs for 2 hours 40 minutes and 9 seconds. The censor board members are reportedly in awe after watching the final product of the film which is directed by Selvaraghavan. According to reports the film's producers, PVP Cinema, will release the fantasy thriller in more than 1,200 screens worldwide which is biggest release ever in Arya's career. Apart from India, "Irandam Ulagam" will release in overseas markets including US, UK, Malaysia, Singapore, Switzerland and France

The advance bookings for the film, which started on Wednesday (20 November), has received a good response. Bookings were high in Chennai city, particularly in multiplexes, said entertainment industry tracker Sreedhar Pillai . As there was a good pre-talk for the Tamil movie, multiplexes in the city decided to open the counters to sell tickets of the movie two days before its release. The bookings had a slow start, and till the afternoon, the response was not high. But post noon, tickets started selling like hot cakes. According to reports, the multiplexes have sold over 15,000 tickets for the first weekend.
The film had a grand worldwide premiere on 21 November all over the USA, where it was released in more than 100 screens.

Box office
The Tamil version earned around  16.46 crore in its opening weekend in Chennai. The film witnessed average theatre occupancy of 79 percent during the first weekend, reported Behindwoods. In the UK, in the opening weekend, Irandam Ulagam earned 19,024 £ (19.28 lacs) at the box office. It got released on 14 screens.

Critical reception
The film received mixed reviews from critics. The Hindu wrote, "With just a handful of movies, Selvaraghavan has announced himself a major filmmaker, and it falls on us to look at his latest venture, Irandaam Ulagam, as the (worthy) next instalment in a thematically connected oeuvre as well as a (problematic) standalone film. It’s a love story without a shred of genuine passion". The Times of India gave the film 2 out of 5 stars and wrote, "The disjointed way in which the scenes play out in this world at times makes one wonder if we are seeing the film version of a feverish dream Selvaraghavan might have had". Behindwoods rated it 3 out of 5 and stated "If you do not question the concept and enjoy the fantasy you will like Irandam Ulagam". Oneindia gave 2.5 out of 5 stated "Full marks to the technical brilliance of Irandam Ulagam. But the decision to watch Irandam Ulagam lies between whether you love watching abstruse movies or purely entertainment flick. If you love to see the former, don't miss it". Sify wrote, "Irandam Ulagam is not everybody’s cup of tea, but the film is made with a lot of passion and sincerity. However, like all his previous films, this one too is ahead of its time". Rediff gave 3 out of 5 and wrote, "Irandam Ulagam is a visually stunning fantasy story set in an imaginary world that describes a love that transcends the human understanding of time and space. (It) is an ambitious project by a director who always strives to give a different and unique experience to his audience".

IANS gave 2 out of 5 stars and wrote, "Selva complicates a simple love story in his attempt to merge romance and fantasy genres, only to give the audience an unbearable experience. The film is ruined by an abstract and complicated screenplay". India Glitz rated 2.75/5 stated "'Irandam Ulagam' is a complete experience. It doesn't have the usual high amounts of action, romance, comedy and masala as a normal Kollywood film would have; though it has all of it, everything is in moderation. A love story beyond one this world, the film is not a thoroughbred strictly Indian flavour, but is meant for the world audience at large. Savouring tastes of global interests, the film is a fair choice of being a multilingual international movie. In all 'Irandam Ulagam' is for the wise audience". Bangalore Mirror wrote, "Selva needs to be commended for having chosen such a challenging theme, though he should have taken a little more care to distinguish between the behavioral traits and life styles of the inhabitants of the two worlds". Deccan Herald gave 2 out of 5 and wrote, "Irandam Ulagam, twin worlds, both of which disappoint given that the narrative makes the audience totally disoriented and disinterested in its dour, dull drama that unfolds in spectacular fashion". The New Indian Express wrote, "Brilliantly conceived, the film, however, falls short on execution".

See also
Planetary romance
Science fiction films in India

References

External links
 

2013 films
Indian romantic drama films
2013 romantic drama films
2013 science fiction action films
2010s romantic fantasy films
Planetary romances
Films shot in Andhra Pradesh
Indian musical fantasy films
Films directed by Selvaraghavan
Films scored by Harris Jayaraj
2010s Tamil-language films
Indian romantic fantasy films
Indian science fiction action films
Films about parallel universes
Indian fantasy action films
Indian science fiction films